Renzo Ostino (7 May 1936 – 19 April 2020) was an Italian rower. He competed at the 1960 Summer Olympics in Rome with the men's coxed pair where they came fifth.

References

1936 births
2020 deaths
Italian male rowers
Olympic rowers of Italy
Rowers at the 1960 Summer Olympics
Sportspeople from Turin
European Rowing Championships medalists